Pseudoarabidopsis is a genus of flowering plants belonging to the family Brassicaceae.

Its native range is Crimea to Southwestern Siberia.

Species:
 Pseudoarabidopsis toxophylla (M.Bieb.) Al-Shehbaz, O'Kane & R.A.Price

References

Brassicaceae
Brassicaceae genera